Abbas-Ali Soleimani (born 1947) is an Iranian Shia cleric/ayatollah who was born in a religious family in Savadkuh, Mazandaran. He is currently the new appointed representative of Vali-e-Faqih and Imam of Friday prayer in the city of Kashan. This Shiite ayatollah went to Kuttab at the age of 5, later on departed to Qom in order to educate at Hawzah when he was 12 years old. Afterwards, he left for Hawzah of Behshahr. Then, Soleimani departed to Mashhad to keep on his Hawzah studies.

Abbas-Ali Soleimani used to teach Islamic lessons as well as studying in seminary, and took trip to diverse villages/cities during his education period. Among Soleimani's (previous) positions are: being as "Imam of Friday Prayer in Babolsar", "the person in charge of Nahade-Rahbari (Mazandaran)", "teaching in Hawzahs/universities", "member of assembly of experts" and so on. Amongst his known teachers are: 

 Hossein Noori Hamedani
 Seyyed Mohammad Hadi Milani
 Mohammad Fazel Lankarani
 Ja'far Sobhani
 Hashem Amoli
 Seyyed Mohammad Reza Golpayegani
 Naser Makarem Shirazi
 Abolghasem Khazali
 Mohammad Yazdi
 Abdollah Javadi-Amoli
 Vaez-Tabasi
 Khorasani
 Meshkini
 Kuhestani
 Adib Neishburi
 Salehi Barbari
 Hojat Hashemi
 Modarres
 Mahami
 Mahdavi Damqani
 Nasrollahi
 Fayeqi
 Tehrani
 Mohammadi Gilani
 Etemadi
Etc.

See also 
 List of provincial representatives appointed by Supreme Leader of Iran

References 

Representatives of the Supreme Leader in the Provinces of Iran
Iranian ayatollahs
1947 births
Living people
People from Savadkuh
People from Mazandaran Province